is a 1978 Japanese film directed by Yoshitaro Nomura. Among many awards, it was chosen as the Best Film at the Japan Academy Prize ceremony.

Cast
 Keiko Matsuzaka: Hatsuko Sakai
 Shinobu Otake: Yoshiko Sakai
 Toshiyuki Nagashima: Hiroshi Ueda
 Tsunehiko Watase: Takeshi Hanai
 Tetsurō Tamba: Kikuchi
 Kei Yamamoto
 Junko Natsu
 Shinsuke Ashida: Okabe
 Shin Saburi
 Nobuko Otowa: Sumie Sakai
 Kō Nishimura
 Tanie Kitabayashi
 Tsutomu Isobe
 Takanobu Hozumi
 Asao Sano
 Hisaya Morishige

Bibliography

References

1978 films
Films based on works by Shōhei Ōoka
Films directed by Yoshitaro Nomura
1970s Japanese-language films
Picture of the Year Japan Academy Prize winners
Shochiku films
Films scored by Yasushi Akutagawa
1970s Japanese films